Napkin folding is a type of decorative folding done with a napkin. It can be done as art or as a hobby. Napkin folding is most commonly encountered as a table decoration in fancy restaurants. Typically, and for best results, a clean, pressed, and starched square cloth (linen or cotton) napkin is used. There are variations in napkin folding in which a rectangular napkin, a napkin ring, a glass, or multiple napkins may be used.

History 
The earliest instruction manual for the artistic folding of napkins was published in 1639 by Matthia Gieger, a German meat carver working in Padua, as a part of a series of treatises on culinary arts titled Le tre trattati. Napkin folding has a centuries-old history and dates back to the times of Louis XIV of France (5 September 1638 – 1 September 1715), known as Louis the Great (Louis le Grand) or the Sun King (le Roi-Soleil), who ruled as King of France from 1643 until his death. The shift of the napkin from simply a folded cloth to a folded art object occurred in the 16th century in Florence, Italy around the same as voluminous clothing, such as ballooned sleeves, had become fashionable among the wealthy.  Rather than simply laying a tablecloth flat on a table, starched linens were folded into large centerpieces, called "triumphs," that could depict a variety of real and mythical animals, natural elements and architectural forms.  A popular gift wedding guests received during this time was a personally folded napkin that distinguished whether they were related to the bride or groom. In the mid-18th century, table setting practices were so specific that in Germany there were particular traditions on how to fold napkins, display figures at the table and arrange plate. During this golden age of napkin folding, there was a school in Nuremberg devoted entirely to this art and butlers had shelves of instructional books to keep up with the changes in the field. Napkin folding in the form of table sculptures began being replaced by porcelain decorations during the 18th century.

Common napkin folds 

Bishop's Hat
Buffet fold (rectangular pocket) 
Candle
Diagonal pocket 
Dress Shirt
Envelope
Fan
Fleur-de-lis
Iris
Lotus (water lily)
Rose

See also 
Napkin folding problem
Origami
Table setting

References

Further reading 
Kuhn, Doris (2005). Napkin Folding for Every Occasion. New York: Sterling Publishing. .
Oppenheimer, Lillian; Epstein, Natalie (1979). Decorative napkin folding for beginners. New York: Dover Publications. .
Stislow, John; Stislow, Stephanie (2008). The Best Napkin Folding Book Ever!: Add Easy Style to Any Meal. New York: Sterling Publications.

External links 
How-to videos on napkin folding by Videojug Arts & Crafts
Step-by-step visual and written instructions for a variety of napkin folds by Napkinfoldingguide.com
Napkin folding ideas from Martha Stewart
How-to videos and written instructions for 24 popular napkin folds from Bright Settings

Textile arts
Articles containing video clips